The following elections occurred in 1968.

Africa
 May 1968 Dahomeyan presidential election
 July 1968 Dahomeyan presidential election
 1968 Spanish Guinean general election
 1968 Guinean general election
 1968 Senegalese general election
 1968 Sudanese parliamentary election
 1968 Zambian general election

Asia
 1968 Singaporean general election

Europe
 1968 Belgian general election
 1968 Danish parliamentary election
 1968 Finnish presidential election
 1968 Icelandic presidential election
 1968 Italian general election
 1968 Luxembourgian legislative election
 1968 Swedish general election

France
 1968 French legislative election

United Kingdom
 1968 Acton by-election
 1968 Dudley by-election
 1968 London local elections
 1968 Meriden by-election
 1968 Warwick and Leamington by-election

United Kingdom local

English local
 1968 Lambeth Council election
 1968 Lewisham Council election
 1968 Newham Council election
 1968 Southwark Council election
 1968 Tower Hamlets council election

Americas
 1968 Panamanian general election
 1968 Salvadoran legislative election
 1968 Venezuelan presidential election

Canada
 1968 Social Credit Party of Alberta leadership election
 1968 Canadian federal election
 1968 Edmonton municipal election
 1968 Liberal Party of Canada leadership election

United States
 1968 United States presidential election

United States House of Representatives
 1968 United States House of Representatives elections
 United States House of Representatives elections in South Carolina, 1968
 United States House of Representatives elections in California, 1968

United States Senate
 1968 United States Senate elections
 United States Senate election in Florida, 1968
 United States Senate election in North Carolina, 1968
 United States Senate election in North Dakota, 1968
 United States Senate election in Oklahoma, 1968
 United States Senate election in Oregon, 1968
 United States Senate election in South Carolina, 1968

California
 United States House of Representatives elections in California, 1968
 United States presidential election in California, 1968

Florida
 United States Senate election in Florida, 1968

New York
 1968 New York state election

Oklahoma
 United States Senate election in Oklahoma, 1968

Oregon
 United States Senate election in Oregon, 1968

South Carolina
 United States House of Representatives elections in South Carolina, 1968
 United States Senate election in South Carolina, 1968

Washington (state)
 Forward Thrust

Oceania
 1968 Cook Islands general election
 1968 Fijian by-elections

Australia
 1968 Higgins by-election
 1968 New South Wales state election
 1968 South Australian state election
 1968 Tasmanian casino referendum
 1968 Western Australian state election

South America

Falkland Islands
 1968 Falkland Islands general election

See also

 
1968
Elections